Lunchmeat VHS Fanzine is a magazine dedicated to the preservation of horror and exploitation films on the VHS format. It is published occasionally and is edited by Josh Schafer. It has been in publication since August 2008.

Content
Lunchmeat VHS contains interviews with actors of niche genre films, painters of VHS cover art, directors of obscure gems, and even proprietors of long-standing VHS rental stores. Lunchmeat VHS also reviews music from horror films (on vinyl), and produces genre-themed crossword puzzles as well as cartoons.

Contributors
Some of the regular writers include John DeSantis, Heather Drain, Rob Hauschild, Louis Justin, David J. Moore, and Josh Schafer.

References

External links 
 
 Cinesploitation Review of Lunchmeat VHS #1 & #2

Film magazines published in the United States
Fanzines
Horror fiction magazines
Magazines established in 2008
Magazines published in New Jersey
Irregularly published magazines published in the United States